Shooting (Spanish: Tiro Deportivo), for the 2013 Bolivarian Games, took place from 17 November to 23 November 2013.

Medal table
Key:

Medal summary

Men

Women

References

Events at the 2013 Bolivarian Games
Bolivarian Games
2013 Bolivarian Games
Shooting competitions in Peru